Marie-Louis-Philippine-Eugénie Servandoni (6 January 1746, Brussels - 22 February 1816, Paris), stage name Eugénie D'Hannetaire, was a French actress.

She was the daughter of the actor-director D'Hannetaire and the actress Marguerite Huet (stage name Mlle Eugénie).  She made her debut at the Théâtre de la Monnaie aged 8, in child roles, then from 15 as a dancer. She is reported to have succeeded her mother in her roles as a soubrette. She left Brussels in 1773 and in Lyon married the comic-actor Larive, from whom she divorced 20 years later.  Prince Charles-Joseph de Ligne vowed her his boundless admiration and dedicated his Lettres à Eugénie sur les spectacles (1774) to her.

References
 Henri Liebrecht: Histoire du théatre français à Bruxelles au XVIIe et au XVIIIe siècle

1746 births
1816 deaths
Actresses from Brussels
French stage actresses
Actors of the Austrian Netherlands
18th-century French actresses
18th-century French dancers
Women of the Austrian Netherlands